Nicolas Woodman (born 21 March 1986) is an English actor best known for playing Jack Hollins in the BBC soap, Doctors from 2009 to 2012.

Television career
Woodman started acting professionally in 2001 when he appeared at the Royal Festival Hall alongside John Thaw and Sheila Hancock amongst other names, in a production of Peter Pan. In 2005, he appeared in the BBC Afternoon plays. He appeared at The Birmingham REP in 2006 in a production called Bolt Hole directed by Nick Bagnall. In the same year he recorded several episodes of the radio show Silver Street. Two years later he had a regular role as Jamie in Nearly Famous where he appeared in five episodes in 2007. In 2008, Woodman played a student in the programme Teenage Kicks for one episode. In 2009, he landed a regular role in the BBC daytime soap opera, Doctors, set in the fictional town of Letherbridge just south-east of Birmingham. He played Jack Hollins, a character studying law at the town university. He left the show in September 2012.

Personal life
Woodman is a runner and has participated in the Great North Run, The Birmingham Half Marathon and the London Marathon where in 2012 he recorded a time of 3 hours.

References

External links

Living people
1986 births
English male soap opera actors
English male radio actors
English male stage actors